Cave Creek is an unincorporated community in Roane County, Tennessee, USA. It does not have a post office and is split between the ZIP codes for Kingston, 37763, and Loudon, 37774. Cave Creek is served by the East Roane County Volunteer Fire Hall #2.

Geography 

The community is located along Cave Creek Road, which intersects U.S. Route 70. Cave Creek, a tributary of the Tennessee River, runs alongside the road. The community is located in eastern Roane County, near the border with Loudon County.

The terrain is hilly, with elevations ranging from around 800 to 1200 feet.

History 
The Cave Creek area was settled in the early 1800s. The community had a school until 1960, and the building is now a community center.

On June 26, 1938, Felix Bushaloo Breazeale held his funeral in Cave Creek while he was still alive, an event that drew thousands of people, and later inspired the movie Get Low.

References 

Unincorporated communities in Roane County, Tennessee
Unincorporated communities in Tennessee